İncə (also, İnçə and Incha) is a village and municipality in the Goychay Rayon of Azerbaijan.  It has a population of 3,721.

References 

Populated places in Goychay District